The 2004 FIBA Africa Under-20 Championship was the only FIBA Africa Under-20 Championship, played under the rules of FIBA, the world governing body for basketball, and the FIBA Africa thereof. The tournament was hosted by Senegal from July 23 to August 1, 2004.

Nigeria defeated Cameroon 83–82 in the final to win the championship. and secured a spot at the 2005 U-21 World Cup.

Squads

Draw

Preliminary round

Knockout stage 
Championship bracket

5-8th bracket

Quarter-finals

5–8th place

Semifinals

7th place

5th place

3rd place

Gold medal match

Final standings

Awards

References

External links
Official Website

2004 FIBA Africa Under-20 Championship
2004 FIBA Africa Under-20 Championship
2004 FIBA Africa Under-20 Championship
International basketball competitions hosted by Senegal